The East Canary gecko or Canary wall gecko (Tarentola angustimentalis) is a species of lizard in the family Phyllodactylidae. It is endemic to the eastern Canary Islands. Its natural habitats are temperate shrubland, Mediterranean-type shrubby vegetation, rocky areas, rocky shores, sandy shores, intertidal marshes, arable land, pastureland, plantations, rural gardens, and urban areas.

Description
It is a sturdy, plump gecko with a dorsally flattened head and body and short sideways projecting legs and resembles the Moorish gecko in general shape. The feet have suction pads all along the toes and these are widest at the tips. There are strong claws on the third and fourth digit of each foot. The skin is fairly smooth with small tubercles which are often multi-keeled. The eyes have vertical pupils in bright light and are brown or golden. The body colour is quite variable, being generally greyish-brown with a paler, sometimes intermittent, stripe along the spine and darker transverse bars. The underside is paler and sometimes tinged yellow, especially near the vent.

The East Canary gecko or Canary wall gecko is a species of lizard endemic to the eastern Canary Islands and often seen in Fuerteventura at night on outdoor walls and ceilings. They can grow to around 15 centimetres in length, and have suction pads all along the toes which are widest at the tips.

Geographic range
The East Canary gecko is found on the Canary Islands of Fuerteventura, Lanzarote, Lobos and several small islands north of Lanzarote.

Habitat
These include cliffs, screes, gullies, salt flats with scrubby vegetation, dunes, cultivated land and even inside houses.

Biology
The diet of the East Canary gecko consists of insects, spiders and other small invertebrates.

Reproduction
The male East Canary gecko is larger than the female and is territorial during the breeding season. It is quite vocal and has a range of calls. Their colouring is rather more vivid than that of the adults. Research has shown that the sex of the embryo is determined by the temperature at which the egg is incubated.

Conservation status
The East Canary gecko is listed as being of "least concern" in the IUCN Red List of Threatened Species. This is because, although the range is very limited, it is common in many parts of that range, its habitats are not threatened and the population does not seem to be declining.

References

Further reading
Steindachner F. 1891. "Über einige neue und seltene Reptilien und Amphibien ". Anzeiger der Kaiserlichen Akademie der Wissenschaften. Mathematisch-Naturwissenschaftlichen Classe 28 (14): 141–144. (Tarentola mauritanica var. angustimentalis, p. 144).

Reptiles of the Canary Islands
Tarentola
Reptiles described in 1891
Endemic fauna of the Canary Islands
Taxonomy articles created by Polbot